It's Like This is an album by the American singer/songwriter  Rickie Lee Jones, released in 2000. Like her 1991 album Pop Pop, it is a covers record. The album was nominated for a 2001 Best Pop Traditional Record Grammy Award.

Critical reception
The Washington Post wrote that "the album's most successful track is Jones's sinewy reading of Steely Dan's edgy missive, 'Show Biz Kids', [which] kicks off with just terse triangle and Richard Davis's snaky bass, with Jones tapping into the caustic detachment and cool cynicism the song's writers always intended."

Track listing 
"Show Biz Kids" (Donald Fagen, Walter Becker) – 4:35
"Trouble Man" (Marvin Gaye) – 5:12
"For No One" (John Lennon, Paul McCartney) – 2:32
"Smile" (Charlie Chaplin, Geoffrey Parsons, John Turner) – 1:49
"The Low Spark of High Heeled Boys" (Jim Capaldi, Steve Winwood) – 5:13
"On the Street Where You Live" (Alan Jay Lerner, Frederick Loewe) – 3:26
"I Can't Get Started" (Vernon Duke, Ira Gershwin) – 4:30
"Up a Lazy River" (Hoagy Carmichael, Sidney Arodin) – 2:50
"Someone to Watch Over Me" (George Gershwin, Ira Gershwin) – 2:03
"Cycles" (Gayle Caldwell) – 3:16
"One Hand, One Heart" (Leonard Bernstein) – 1:58

Personnel
Rickie Lee Jones – vocals, guitar, organ
Bruce Brody – organ
John Pizzarelli – acoustic guitar
Alex Foster – saxophone
Jeff Dellisanti – bass clarinet
Conrad Herwig – trombone
Richard Davis – acoustic bass
Paul Nowinski – acoustic bass
Mike Elizondo – acoustic bass
Peter Erskine – drums
Carl Allen – drums
Rick Marotta – drums
Bashiri Johnson – percussion
Joe Jackson – piano, backing vocals on "Show Biz Kids", "For No One" and "One Hand, One Heart"
Ben Folds – piano on "Low Spark of High Heeled Boys"
Ben Folds, Dan Hicks, Taj Mahal – backing vocals on "Up a Lazy River"
Technical
Ben Sidran – co-producer (tracks: 1, 6–8, 10)
Barry Goldberg, James Farber, Larry Alexander, Rob Smith – engineer
Lee Cantelon – art direction, photography

Chart positions

References

External links
Discography at Rickie Lee Jones official web site.

2000 albums
Rickie Lee Jones albums
Artemis Records albums
Covers albums